Baranduzchay-ye Jonubi Rural District is in the Central District of Urmia County, West Azerbaijan province, Iran. At the National Census of 2006, its population was 10,068 in 2,355 households. There were 9,416 inhabitants in 2,619 households at the following census of 2011. At the most recent census of 2016, the population of the rural district was 11,408 in 3,117 households. The largest of its 38 villages was Balanej, with 3,023 people.

References 

Urmia County

Rural Districts of West Azerbaijan Province

Populated places in West Azerbaijan Province

Populated places in Urmia County